Six regiments of the British Army have been numbered the 95th Regiment of Foot:
1760–1763, 95th Regiment of Foot (Burton's) - Fought in the Anglo-Cherokee War, participated in the capture of Martinique, the occupation of Grenada, and the 1762 Battle of Havana
1779–1783, 95th Regiment of Foot (Reid's) - Participated in the Battle of Jersey in 1781
1794–1796, 95th Regiment of Foot (William Edmeston's) - Served on the Isle of Man, and at Dublin and Cape of Good Hope. Disbanded.
1803–1816, the elite rifle armed 95th (Rifle) Regiment of Foot raised by Coote Manningham. In 1816 the 95th Regiment of Foot (Riflemen) became the Rifle Brigade (Prince Consort's Own)
1816–1818, 96th Regiment of Foot (1803) - Formed 1803, retitled 95th Regiment of Foot in 1816. Disbanded as 95th in 1818
1823–1881, 95th (Derbyshire) Regiment of Foot, raised in 1823. In 1881, during the Childers Reforms it was united with the 45th Regiment of Foot to form the Sherwood Foresters